The West Reserve was a block settlement plot of land in Manitoba set aside by the Government of Canada exclusively for settlement by Russian Mennonite settlers in 1876.
After signing Treaty 1 with the Anishinabe and Swampy Cree First Nations, the Canadian government sent William Hespeler to recruit Mennonite farmers to the region. In 1873 Mennonite delegates from the Russian Empire, (David Klassen, Jacob Peters, Heinrich Wiebe, and Cornelius Toews), visited the area and agreed to a Privilegium outlining religious freedom, military exemption, and land. This land became known as the East Reserve, because it was east of the Red River. 

After two years, however, it was determined that the land of East Reserve was limited and unsuitable for farming, so a second larger reserve on the west side of the Red River was established in 1876. This land became known as the West Reserve. Many of the Mennonite settlers of the West Reserve stayed at Fort Dufferin before venturing out to establish villages in the reserve. In 1878, more than 200 Bergthal Mennonite relocated to the more fertile region of the West Reserve, and later immigrants moved directly to the region from Russia. These settlers established more than 70 villages, many of which still remain today including Altona, Neubergthal, Reinland, Sommerfeld and many others.

Each village was governed by a Schulz, or mayor, and the entire West Reserve was governed by an Oberschulz. This system of governance ended with the establishment of Rural Municipalities. Rather than using open field farming, Mennonites lived in street villages called Strassendorfs, and built housebarns, many of which remain today in villages such as Sommerfeld, Neubergthal, Reinland and many others.

In 1897, the area was visited by Russian prince and anarchist Peter Kropotkin who praised the local Mennonites for their industriousness and communal lifestyle.

References

Russian Mennonite diaspora in Manitoba
History of Manitoba